The 1934 football season was São Paulo's 5th season since the club's founding in 1930.

Overall

{|class="wikitable"
|-
|Games played || 33 (14 Campeonato Paulista, 19 Friendly match)
|-
|Games won ||  23 (10 Campeonato Paulista, 13 Friendly match)
|-
|Games drawn ||  4 (3 Campeonato Paulista, 1 Friendly match)
|-
|Games lost ||  6 (1 Campeonato Paulista, 5 Friendly match)
|-
|Goals scored || 81
|-
|Goals conceded || 42
|-
|Goal difference || +39
|-
|Best result || 9–1 (H) v Sírio - Campeonato Paulista - 1934.4.1
|-
|Worst result || 0–3 (A) v Vasco da Gama - Friendly match - 1934.3.11
|-
|Top scorer || 
|-

Friendlies

Torneio Extra do Paulista

Official competitions

Campeonato Paulista

External links
official website 

Association football clubs 1934 season
1934
1934 in Brazilian football